The eunuch flute, onion flute, or mirliton (flûte à l'oignon or mirliton) is a musical instrument of the woodwind family used during the 16th and 17th centuries. It produces music akin to a comb and paper, and is still manufactured as a toy.

The eunuch flute's sound highly resembles a kazoo. The eunuch flute, unlike a kazoo, is held horizontally against the mouth while the user vocalizes into the aperture.

The eunuch flute consists of a wooden tube widening out slightly to form a bell. The upper end of the tube is closed by means of a very fine membrane similar to an onion skin stretched across the aperture like the vellum of a drum. The mouthpiece, a simple round hole, is pierced a couple of inches below the membrane. Into this hole the performer sings, their voice setting up vibrations in the membrane (technically a mirliton), which thus intensifies the sound and changes its timbre to a bleating quality. A movable cap fits over the membrane to protect it. Marin Mersennus has given a drawing of the eunuch flute together with a description. He states that the vibrations of the membrane improve the sound of the voice, and by reflecting it, give it an added charm. There were concerts of these flutes in four or five parts in France, adds Mersennus, and they had the advantage over other kinds of reproducing more nearly the sound of the voice.

The Irish writer Samuel Beckett wrote a series of fifty-nine small poems in French called mirlitonnades after the instrument.

The Creole composer, Edmond Dédé wrote Méphisto Masqué for grand orchestra and a fanfare of Mirlitone Instruments.

See also

 Kazoo
 Swazzle

Notes

References

Attribution:

Early musical instruments
Singing membranophones
Toy instruments and noisemakers